Maria Kazakova may refer to:

 Maria Kazakova (canoeist) (Мария Вячеславовна Казакова; born 1988), Russian sprint canoeist
 Maria Kazakova (figure skater) (Мария Евгеньевна Казакова; born 2001), Russian-Georgian ice dancer